The Minister of State for Trade Policy is a mid-level role at the Department for Business and Trade in the Government of the United Kingdom. It was held by Greg Hands, who held the office from 9 October 2022 to 7 February 2023. The minister deputizes for the Secretary of State for International Trade.

History 
Although only a Minister of State position, it was considered to be one of the most important jobs outside Cabinet rank as when Douglas Alexander became Minister of State for Trade in September 2004, he was given a special provision to attend the Cabinet meetings.

The subsequent role of Minister of State for Investment was created in 2021.

The minister formerly worked at the Department for Business, Innovation and Skills.

List of ministers

Minister of State for Investment

Notes

References

External links
Official UKTI website
Gov.uk Minister of State for Trade and Investment

Trade
United Kingdom
Investment in the United Kingdom
Trade in the United Kingdom
Department for International Trade
Trade ministers of the United Kingdom